Aphaenops cissauguensis is a species of beetle in the subfamily Trechinae. It was described by Faille & Bourdeau in 2008.

References

cissauguensis
Beetles described in 2008